The 1991 Trust House Forte Matchroom League was a  professional non-ranking snooker tournament that was played from January to May 1991.

Stephen Hendry topped the table and won the tournament. 


League phase

If points were level then match wins, followed by most frames won determined their positions. If two players had an identical record then the result in their match determined their positions. If that ended 4–4 then the player who got to four first was higher.

 Tony Meo 5–3 Doug Mountjoy
 Steve Davis 7–1 Dennis Taylor
 Tony Meo 5–3 Neal Foulds
 Steve James 6–2 Doug Mountjoy
 Steve James 7–1 Willie Thorne
 Tony Meo 4–4 Jimmy White
 Stephen Hendry 5–3 Steve James
 James Wattana 5–3 Jimmy White
 Doug Mountjoy 5–3 Neal Foulds
 Steve James 4–4 Steve Davis
 Willie Thorne 5–3 Dennis Taylor
 Neal Foulds 4–4 Jimmy White
 James Wattana 4–4 Tony Meo
 Neal Foulds 4–4 Dennis Taylor
 Dennis Taylor 4–4 Doug Mountjoy
 Jimmy White 5–3 Willie Thorne
 Neal Foulds 7–1 Steve James
 Jimmy White 6–2 Dennis Taylor
 Willie Thorne 4–4 James Wattana
 Stephen Hendry 7–1 Jimmy White
 James Wattana 5–3 Doug Mountjoy
 Stephen Hendry 7–1 Dennis Taylor
 Neal Foulds 5–3 James Wattana
 Willie Thorne 4–4 Steve Davis
 Neal Foulds 5–3 Willie Thorne
 Steve Davis 4–4 James Wattana
 Stephen Hendry 6–2 Tony Meo
 Jimmy White 4–4 Steve Davis
 Willie Thorne 5–3 Stephen Hendry
 Steve Davis 7–1 Doug Mountjoy
 Dennis Taylor 5–3 Tony Meo
 Steve Davis 4–4 Neal Foulds
 Stephen Hendry 6–2 Neal Foulds
 Stephen Hendry 4–4 Steve Davis
 Steve James 4–4 James Wattana
 Steve James 6–2 Tony Meo
 Jimmy White 7–1 Doug Mountjoy
 Stephen Hendry 6–2 Doug Mountjoy
 Willie Thorne 5–3 Doug Mountjoy
 Steve Davis 6–2 Tony Meo
 James Wattana 6–2 Dennis Taylor
 Willie Thorne 5–3 Tony Meo
 Dennis Taylor 4–4 Steve James
 Stephen Hendry 5–3 James Wattana
 Jimmy White 5–3 Steve James

References

Premier League Snooker
1991 in snooker
1991 in British sport